Alexander Arbuthnot may refer to:

 Alexander Arbuthnot (poet) (1538–1583), Scottish poet and Principal of King's College, Aberdeen
 Alexander Arbuthnot (printer) (died 1585), printer in Edinburgh, Scotland
 Alexander Arbuthnot (politician) (1654–1705), Scottish politician
 Alexander Arbuthnot (Baron of Exchequer) (1674–1721), a.k.a. Alexander Maitland, Scottish politician
 Alexander Arbuthnot (bishop) (1768–1828), Irish Bishop of Killaloe
 Alexander Dundas Young Arbuthnott (1789–1871), British naval officer
 Alexander John Arbuthnot (1822–1907), British official and writer
 Alexander Arbuthnot (paddle steamer) (built 1923), the last paddle steamer built as a working boat on the Murray River, Australia
 The Arbuthnot and Ambrister incident, in which Robert Ambrister and Alexander George Arbuthnot were hanged by Andrew Jackson.
 Sandy Arbuthnot, Lord Clanroyden, John Buchan character

See also
 Arbuthnot (surname)

Arbuthnot, Alexander